The 2014 Judo Grand Prix Qingdao was held at the Guoxin Gymnasium in Qingdao, China from 19 to 21 November 2014.

Medal summary

Men's events

Women's events

Source Results

Medal table

References

External links
 

2014 IJF World Tour
2014 Judo Grand Prix
Judo
Judo competitions in China
Judo